"Too Many Walls" is a song by British singer-songwriter Cathy Dennis. "Too Many Walls" is a midtempo pop ballad and was co-written by Dennis and Anne Dudley, member of the avant-garde synthpop musical group Art of Noise. The song was originally a composition of Dudley's with strings but no lyrics, until Dennis adapted the song and added words before it appeared on her debut album. The song was then remixed into a more radio-friendly version before being released as a single on 23 September 1991 in the United Kingdom.

The song became Dennis' fourth top-10 hit on the US Billboard Hot 100, where it peaked at number eight and lasted for 20 weeks on the listing. "Too Many Walls" also spent two weeks atop the Billboard Hot Adult Contemporary Tracks chart. In the United Kingdom, the song reached number 17 on the UK Singles Chart in October, and in Canada, it peaked at number 10 in September. The music video was filmed at the newly opened Stansted airport, and directed by Rocky Morton and Annabel Jankel.

Content
In an interview with Rolling Stone magazine, Dennis stated that she thinks the ballad is "the best song on the album, especially in terms of lyrics. The other songs are fun, but they can be quite vacant." She said the song is "about when you want to be together with someone, but other people's opinions and prejudices get in the way."

Critical reception
Larry Flick from Billboard wrote, "After a pair of top 10 dance tunes, Dennis drops the tempo for a nicely sung, sugary ballad. Will likely keep popsters in tow, while broadening base to include AC programmers." Mark Frith from Smash Hits commented, "...this is Cathy's big ballad, a perfect end-of-summer song whether you're pining for Pedro from the Spanish swimming pool or that person with the nice eyes you met in Bridlington. Too Many Walls is a lush, low-key ballad that is the high-spot of her album and quite obviously from the heart as well."

Track listings
UK CD single
"Too Many Walls"
"Too Many Walls" (L'autre Mix)
"Too Many Walls" (a cappella)

US cassette single
"Too Many Walls" (Radio Mix)
"Too Many Walls" (a cappella)

Charts

Weekly charts

Year-end charts

References

1990 songs
1991 singles
Pop ballads
Cathy Dennis songs
Songs written by Cathy Dennis
Songs written by Anne Dudley
Music videos directed by Rocky Morton